Denis Law is a Scottish retired football player, who represented the Scotland national football team from 1958 to 1974. During that time he scored 30 international goals in 55 appearances. This made him the all-time top goalscorer for Scotland, a status he has held since scoring his 25th goal in 1966. The record was previously held by Hughie Gallacher, who scored 24 goals in 20 matches between 1924 and 1935. Law's record was equalled by Kenny Dalglish in 1984, and the two have been co-holders of the record ever since.

Law's goal tally included three hat-tricks: he scored four goals in a 5–1 win against Northern Ireland on 7 November 1962, three in a 4–3 win against Norway on 4 June 1963 and four in a 6–1 win against Norway on 7 November 1963. Law jointly holds the record for Scotland hat-tricks, with three, and he is the only player to have scored four goals or more in a game on more than one occasion.

Law is the only Scottish player to have won the Ballon d'Or, in 1964. He also finished fourth in the voting in 1963. Law only played in one major tournament finals for Scotland, as his career largely coincided with a long qualification drought between 1958 and 1974. He played in one match at the 1974 World Cup finals, a 2–0 win against Zaire, which was his 55th and final appearance for Scotland.

List of goals scored
Scores and results list Scotland's goal tally first.

Statistics

See also
 List of international goals scored by Kenny Dalglish
 Scotland national football team records and statistics

References

Law, Denis
Law, Denis